Shui Pin Wai Estate is a public housing estate in Yuen Long Town, New Territories, Hong Kong, near Light Rail Shui Pin Wai stop. It is the second public housing estate in Yuen Long Town and consists of seven residential buildings mainly built in 1981, but one of the blocks, Dip Shui House, was later built in 1998.

Houses

Demographics
According to the 2016 by-census, Shui Pin Wai Estate had a population of 6,725. The median age was 55.8 and the majority of residents (94.4 per cent) were of Chinese ethnicity. The average household size was 2.5 people. The median monthly household income of all households (i.e. including both economically active and inactive households) was HK$19,000.

Politics
Shui Pin Wai Estate is located in Shui Pin constituency of the Yuen Long District Council. It is currently represented by Lai Kwok-wing, who was elected in the 2019 elections.

See also

Public housing estates in Yuen Long

References

Yuen Long Town
Public housing estates in Hong Kong
Housing estates with centralized LPG system in Hong Kong